Alex & the Gypsy is a 1976 American comedy film directed by John Korty and written by Lawrence B. Marcus. The film stars Jack Lemmon, Geneviève Bujold, James Woods, Gino Ardito, Robert Emhardt and Titos Vandis. The film was released on October 3, 1976, by 20th Century Fox.

Plot

Cast 
Jack Lemmon as Alexander Main
Geneviève Bujold as Maritza
James Woods as Crainpool
Gino Ardito as The Golfer
Robert Emhardt as Judge Ehrlinger
Titos Vandis as Treska
William Cort as Public Defender 
Todd Martin as Roy Blake
Frank Doubleday as Prisoner
Joseph X. Flaherty as Morgan
Robert Miano as Young Shepherd
Al Checco as Nat
Harold Sylvester as First Goon
Clyde Kusatsu as X-Ray Technician
Alan DeWitt as Attendant
Eddra Gale as Telephone Lady
Victor Pinheiro as Mr. Chandler

Reception
Roger Ebert gave the film two and a half stars out of four, saying "Alex and the Gypsy takes a strange, disjointed story and tells it with enough style that the movie sometimes works in spite of itself. It's so uncertain of its own intentions that we never do discover quite what its two central characters feel about each other, but in the midst of this mess there are five or six scenes that are really fine. And there's some spirited acting, too, by Jack Lemmon as a rumpled bailbondsman, and Genevieve Bujold as, of all things, a gypsy."

References

External links 
 
 

1976 films
1970s English-language films
20th Century Fox films
American comedy films
1976 comedy films
Films directed by John Korty
Films scored by Henry Mancini
1970s American films